The Cossiga I Cabinet, led by Francesco Cossiga, was the 36th cabinet of the Italian Republic.

Cossiga resigned on 19 March 1980 and was re-appointed to form a second government.

Party breakdown
 Christian Democracy (DC): prime minister, 17 ministers, 38 undersecretaries
 Italian Democratic Socialist Party (PSDI): 3 ministers, 6 undersecretaries
 Italian Liberal Party (PLI): 2 ministers, 2 undersecretaries
 Independents (PSI area): 2 ministers, 1 undersecretary

Composition

|}

References

Italian governments
1979 establishments in Italy
1980 disestablishments in Italy
Cabinets established in 1979
Cabinets disestablished in 1980